Live in Concert is a live double album by English rock band Sad Café, released in March 1981 by RCA Records. It was the band's only live album while together and was the last album by the band to be released under RCA. The album peaked at number 37 on the UK Albums Chart.

The album was recorded at the Manchester Apollo, across three days in April 1980 (15 to 17 April) as part of a 24 concert 'Tour of Britain' to promote the band's third album Facades which had been released in September 1979. The live album includes songs from the band's first three albums. The song "I Believe (Love Will Survive)" was also performed, but not included on the album. It was instead included on the Live in Concert EP, along with "Black Rose", "Emptiness" and "Hungry Eyes", released in February 1981. The album was reissued on CD by Cherry Red Records on 20 October 2014 and included "I Believe (Love Will Survive)" as a bonus track.

Track listing

Personnel 
Sad Café

Paul Young – lead vocals
 Ashley Mulford – lead guitar, backing vocals
 Ian Wilson – rhythm guitar, backing vocals
 John Stimpson – bass guitar, backing vocals
Vic Emerson – keyboards
 Dave Irving – drums
 Lenni Zaksen – saxophone

Technical

 Neil Levine – recording engineer, producer, remixing
 Nigel Walker – recording engineer
 Recorded at the Manchester Apollo using the Island Mobile; remixed at Revolution Studios, Manchester

References 

1981 live albums
Sad Café (band) albums
RCA Records live albums